Leonhard Deininger  (11 November 1910 - 17 September 2002) was a German politician, representative of the Christian Social Union of Bavaria.

From 1958-1970 he was a deputy in the Landtag of Bavaria for the constituency of Regensburg-Land, a member of the Bavarian Senate (1972-1977) as well as County Commissioner in the district of Regensburg (1948-1978).

See also
List of Bavarian Christian Social Union politicians

References

Christian Social Union in Bavaria politicians
1910 births
2002 deaths
Officers Crosses of the Order of Merit of the Federal Republic of Germany